Lindsey Burgess (born July 21, 1999) is a Canadian curler from Truro, Nova Scotia. She currently plays second on Team Jessica Daigle. As a junior, Burgess won a gold medal at the 2018 World Junior Curling Championships with skip Kaitlyn Jones.

Career
Burgess played on a couple teams from 2014–17 before joining the Kaitlyn Jones rink for the 2017–18 season. They won the New Scotland Clothing Ladies Cashspiel and had a quarterfinal finish at the Spitfire Arms Cash Spiel on the World Curling Tour. They would also win the Nova Scotia junior championship and represent Nova Scotia at the 2018 Canadian Junior Curling Championships, Burgess' first national appearance. At nationals they did not stumble, finishing the round robin and championship pool with a 9–1 record, sending them to the final. They defeated Quebec 5–3 to claim Nova Scotia's fifth title in the women's competition. They would continue their impressive play at the 2018 World Junior Curling Championships in Aberdeen, Scotland posting a 7–2 round robin record. They successfully knocked off China and Sweden in the playoff round to win the gold medal. They finished their season at the 2018 Humpty's Champions Cup slam event where they went 0–4.

The following season, the team was invited to play in the 2018 Masters Grand Slam of Curling event as the sponsors exemption. Despite this, they finished the round robin with a 3–1 record, beating Rachel Homan, Kerri Einarson and Silvana Tirinzoni with their only loss coming to Tracy Fleury. They couldn't continue their momentum into the playoffs however, falling to Chelsea Carey in the quarterfinals. Team Jones would win the Nova Scotia junior championship once again this season, sending them to the national championship for a second time. They qualified for the playoffs once again but had to go through the semifinal to advance to the final. Unfortunately, they lost to British Columbia's Sarah Daniels and would not advance.

Team Jones disbanded after the season as Kaitlyn Jones was aging out of juniors. Karlee Burgess and Lauren Lenentine moved to Manitoba and Burgess joined a new team with Taylour Stevens skipping. They easily won the provincial junior title this year, going undefeated through the event. At nationals, Team Stevens finished 8–2 throughout pool play, clinching them a playoff berth. Things wouldn't go their way in the semifinal however, losing to Alberta's Abby Marks in an extra end. Later that year, Burgess competed for Dalhousie at the 2020 U Sports/Curling Canada University Curling Championships where they finished fifth.

Burgess aged out of juniors the following season and reunited with her former skip Kaitlyn Jones. They brought on Jessica Daigle, Brigitte MacPhail and Kaitlin Fralic to their team.

Personal life
Burgess is a student at Dalhousie University. Her cousin, Karlee Burgess, played on her gold medal-winning team in 2018.

Teams

References

External links

1999 births
Living people
Canadian women curlers
Curlers from British Columbia
Curlers from Nova Scotia
Dalhousie University alumni
People from the Cariboo Regional District
People from Truro, Nova Scotia